The China national korfball team is managed by the Korfball Promotion Committee of China (KCCP), representing China in korfball international competitions.

Tournament history

Current squad
National team in the 2011 World Championship

References 

National korfball teams
Korfball
Korfball in China